Maximiliano Rodríguez or Maxi Rodríguez may refer to:

Maximiliano Rodríguez (footballer, born 1988), Argentine midfielder
Maximiliano Rodríguez (Chilean footballer) (born 2000), Chilean forward
Maximiliano Leonel Rodríguez (born 1994), Argentine attacking midfielder
Maximiliano Óscar Rodríguez (born 1988), Spanish athlete who competes in short-distance races
Maxi Rodríguez (Maximiliano Rubén Rodríguez, born 1981), Argentine footballer
Maxi Rodríguez (Uruguayan footballer) (Maximiliano Rodríguez Maeso, born 1990), Uruguayan footballer
Maxi Rodriguez (soccer) (born 1995), American footballer